Hobsons Bay is a small open bay in Victoria, Australia, and is the northernmost part of the larger Port Phillip Bay. The Yarra River flows into Hobsons Bay.

Hobsons Bay is named after William Hobson who led the surveying party in Port Philip Bay.

Beaches
Beaches adjoining the bay are Sandridge Beach (in Port Melbourne), Port Melbourne Beach (in Port Melbourne), South Melbourne Beach (in Albert Park), West Beach  (in St Kilda West) and St Kilda Beach (in St Kilda).

See also
City of Hobsons Bay
Hobsons Bay Coastal Trail
 Melbourne and Hobson's Bay Railway Company

References

Port Phillip
Bays of Victoria (Australia)
Ports and harbours of Victoria (Australia)